WPMX (94.9 FM) is a radio station broadcasting an adult contemporary format. Licensed to Millen, Georgia, United States, the station is currently owned by Neal Ardman, through licensee Radio Statesboro, Inc. It features programming from Jones Radio Network.

History
The station went on the air as WMKO on 1989-09-20. On 1994-02-04, the station changed its call sign to WHKN. The station swapped call signs with sister station WPMX on August 9, 2018.

References

External links

PMX
Radio stations established in 1990
1990 establishments in Georgia (U.S. state)
Mainstream adult contemporary radio stations in the United States